Mont Bengoué is the highest mountain in Gabon. Mont Bengoué is located in the Ogooué-Ivindo Province.

See also
 Mont Iboundji

References

External links
 Peakbagger listing

Mountains of Gabon
Highest points of countries